The WAGR ADX class was a 10 member class of diesel railcars operated by the Western Australian Government Railways between 1959 and 1988.

History
Based on the Cravens built ADG/ADH class railcars, in 1959 the Midland Railway Workshops delivered the first of 10 ADX railcars. In 1966, ADX670 was fitted with power doors. Although deemed a success, no more conversions followed. Withdrawals commenced in 1982 with the last withdrawn in September 1988. Some donated their engines to ADGs.

References

Diesel multiple units of Western Australia